Alexandra Manuela Arce Plúas (born 31 July 1977) is an Ecuadorian politician and engineer.

Biography
Alexandra Arce was born in Guayaquil, Ecuador, on 31 July 1977.

During her time on the council, Arce was set against the policies of Mayor Dalton Narváez, of the Social Christian Party. In May 2010, Arce filed a complaint with a prosecutor against the mayor and his mother, former Mayor Mariana Mendieta, over allegations of a physical attack and corruption in Narváez's government.

Citations

1977 births
Living people
Members of the National Congress (Ecuador)
PAIS Alliance politicians
Women mayors of places in Ecuador
21st-century Ecuadorian women politicians
21st-century Ecuadorian politicians
Women members of the National Assembly (Ecuador)